is a tributary of the Tama River in Tokyo, Japan. It is 30.15 km long, flowing from mountains in Hachiōji to the Tama in the city of Hino.

External links
 (mouth)

Rivers of Tokyo
Rivers of Japan